The Grand Order of Franjo Tuđman, or officially the Grand Order of President of the Republic Franjo Tuđman with Sash and Morning Star (Velered predsjednika Republike Franje Tuđmana s lentom i Danicom), is the 5th highest state order of Croatia. It is awarded to Croatian citizens, as an expression of the highest recognition of the Republic of Croatia for promoting Croatian state and national interests at home and abroad, especially for promoting civic unity and national unity, statehood and spiritual values of the Croatian people. It is awarded by the President of Croatia. The order has one class. It is named after the first President of Croatia Franjo Tuđman.

Recipients
 2019 - Franjo Kuharić (posthumously)

References

External links 
 Zakon o odlikovanjima i priznanjima Republike Hrvatske ("Narodne novine", br. 20/1995., 57/06., 141/06., 118/19.).
 Pravilnik o izmjenama i dopunama Pravilnika o odlikovanjima i priznanjima

Orders, decorations, and medals of Croatia
Awards established in 2019
2019 establishments in Croatia